"Carissima" is the alma mater of Hamilton College, words and music by M. W. Stryker in 1872.

After Hamilton became a coeducational institution in 1978, the original lyrics of the song were updated to reflect the fact that not every student was male.

References

External links 
 Prof. Pellman's "Carissima" tribute page

Institutional songs
Hamilton College (New York)
1872 songs